Raayudu is a 1998 Telugu-language family drama film produced by Mohan Babu and directed by Ravi Raja Pinisetty. It stars Mohan Babu in the lead role along with Rachana, Prathyusha and Soundarya amongst others. A remake of the Tamil film Vallal, the film was a box office failure.

Cast

Mohan Babu as Raayudu
Rachana as Lakshmi
Soundarya as Madhavi
Prathyusha as Rani
Brahmanandam
Kota Srinivasa Rao
Nirmalamma
Srihari
Ambika 
Padma 
Menaka 
Chalapathi Rao 
M. S. Narayana 
Babu Mohan 
Sai Krishna 
Naveen 
Kakarala 
Yechuri 
Potti Satyam 
Pattabhi 
Jaggu 
PV Narasimha Rao 
Prakash Raj 
Revathi 
Vijaya Lakshmi 
Sadhika 
Lakshmi Nair

Soundtrack

Production
The film was a remake of the Tamil film Vallal starring Sathyaraj in the lead role.

References

External links

1998 films
1990s Telugu-language films
Telugu remakes of Tamil films